Here Be Monsters is the fifteenth studio album by the melodic hard rock band Ten. The first single from the album, the track "Fearless", was released on 6 December 2021., while the second one, "Hurricane", was released on 12 January 2022.

Track listing
All songs written by Gary Hughes.
 "Fearless" – 6:53
 "Chapter and Psalm" – 8:18
 "Hurricane" – 4:35
 "Strangers on a Distant Shore" – 6:07
 "The Dream That Fell to Earth" – 6:25
 "The Miracle of Life" – 5:48
 "Anything You Want" – 4:47
 "Immaculate Friends" – 5:19
 "Follow Me into the Fire" – 7:11
 "The Longest Time" – 4:55

Personnel

Ten
Gary Hughes – vocals, guitars, backing vocals
Dann Rosingana – lead guitars
Steve Grocott – lead guitars
Darrel Treece-Birch – keyboards, programming
Steve Mckenna – bass guitar
 Markus Kullman – drums and percussion

Production
Gary Hughes – production

Charts

References

Ten (band) albums
2022 albums